Urshanabad (also Romanized as Ūrshānābād; also known as Qarehlar) is a village in Minjavan-e Sharqi Rural District, Minjavan District, Khoda Afarin County, East Azerbaijan Province, Iran. At the 2006 census, its population was 46, in 12 families.

References 

Populated places in Khoda Afarin County